Abacetus furax is a species of ground beetle in the subfamily Pterostichinae. It was described by Andrewes in 1936.

References

furax
Beetles described in 1936